The Convent of the Sacred Heart High School was a Catholic girls' school in Vancouver, Canada. The building was constructed in 1912/13 in the Gothic Revival style, and is regarded as being of historic interest. Since 1979 it has been site of the Junior School of St George's School.

History
The Convent of the Sacred Heart was a day and boarding school for girls in Vancouver B.C. from 1913-1979. The school was part of the International Network of Sacred Heart Schools founded by the Society of the Sacred Heart in 1800. The building was bought by St. George's School for boys to house their Junior School. It has become a Vancouver City Heritage Building, and St. George's has restored, maintained, and expanded the school's Gothic Revival style architecture. The architect of the school was Charles G. Badgley.

Architecture
Convent of the Sacred Heart is an excellent example of Vancouver's Gothic Revival style architecture.

References

High schools in Vancouver
Catholic secondary schools in British Columbia
Educational institutions established in 1913
1913 establishments in British Columbia
Heritage buildings in Vancouver